Gillem is a surname. Notable people with the surname include:

Alvan Cullem Gillem (1830–1875), Union Army officer
Alvan Cullem Gillem II (1917–2009), United States Air Force general
Alvan Cullom Gillem Jr. (1888–1973), United States Army general
Gladys Gillem (1920–2009), American professional wrestler
Jenks Gillem (c. 1890 – 1951), American football player and coach

See also
Fort Gillem, a former United States Army post in Forest Park, Georgia